Caladenia brumalis, commonly known as winter spider orchid, is a plant in the orchid family Orchidaceae and is endemic to South Australia. It has an erect, hairy leaf and usually a single white to pinkish flower with darker markings. It is only found in a few places due to habitat loss and is considered to be vulnerable.

Description

The petals are similar to the lateral sepals but slightly shorter and narrower. Flowering occurs in August and September.

Taxonomy and naming
Caladenia brumalis was first formally described by David L. Jones in 1991 from a specimen collected near Port Victoria and the description was published in Australian Orchid Research. The specific epithet (brumalis) is a Latin word meaning "of the shortest day" or "wintry"  and refers to the late winter flowering of this orchid.

Distribution and habitat
This caladenia occurs in woodland, mallee, shrubland and sedgeland in restricted coastal locations near Adelaide and on the Eyre and Yorke Peninsulas. It is known to flower profusely after fire.

Conservation
Caladenia brumalis is classified as "vulnerable" under the Australian Government Environment Protection and Biodiversity Conservation Act 1999 and the National Parks and Wildlife Act 1972 of South Australia. The main threats to it are loss of habitat, high grazing pressure and weed invasion.

References

brumalis
Endemic orchids of Australia
Orchids of South Australia
Plants described in 1991
Taxa named by David L. Jones (botanist)